The Next Chapter is a Canadian radio program, which airs on CBC Radio One. Hosted by Shelagh Rogers, the program is an hour-long weekly magazine show on books and literature, including interviews with writers.

The program was launched in 2008, replacing Ian Brown's similar show Talking Books.

References

External links
 The Next Chapter

Literary radio programs
Canadian talk radio programs
CBC Radio One programs
2008 radio programme debuts
Book podcasts